Rezvanshahr (also Romanized as Reẕvānshahr and Rezvānshahr; old name; Rezvandeh (Persian: رضوانده), also Romanized as Reẕvāndeh and Rezvāndeh; also known as Razvand, Rizvand, and Rizwand) is a city and capital of Rezvanshahr County, Gilan Province, Iran.  At the 2006 census, its population was 12,355, in 3,330 families.

History
In 1937, the Anzali to Astara road was completed and included Rezvanshahr on its path. This brought a lot of travellers and tourists to the city.

References

Populated places in Rezvanshahr County
Cities in Gilan Province